Profile Rock (also known as the Old Man of Joshua's Mountain) was a 50-foot high granite rock formation located in Freetown, Massachusetts just outside Assonet village and near the Freetown State Forest. Local Wampanoags believe it to be the image of Chief Massasoit. The Wampanoags occupied the region of Rhode Island and Massachusetts bounded by Narragansett Bay to the west and the Atlantic Ocean to the east, and Chief Massasoit was a close friend to the early Pilgrim settlers.

Joshua's Mountain was named after Joshua Tisdale who was the first to settle near the site. It was privately owned for several years by former Freetown Selectman Ben Evans, who sold it to the Commonwealth of Massachusetts to be used as a state park tourist attraction. In recent years, the site has been frequently vandalized with graffiti, despite an aggressive cleanup effort by the Bristol County Sheriff. On June 19, 2019, at approximately 9:22 am, the Freetown Police Department along with the Freetown Fire Department responded to the Freetown State Forest “Profile Rock” Park for a report of recent damages to the historic rock formation, Old Man of Joshua's Mountain. First responders and park officials discovered that a large portion of the rock formation had broken off.

State forest officials have closed the park until further notice due to the unsafe environment. The public is encouraged to stay away from the area.

See also

 List of rock formations that resemble human beings
 Pareidolia
 Cydonia, location of the "Face on Mars"
 Old Man of the Lake
 Old Man of the Mountain
 Mount Pemigewasset, another New Hampshire rock formation

References

External links

Rock formations of Massachusetts
Landmarks in Massachusetts
Landforms of Bristol County, Massachusetts
Freetown, Massachusetts
Native American history of Massachusetts